Pieterson is a surname. Notable people with the surname include:

George Pieterson (1942–2016), Dutch clarinetist
Hector Pieterson (1964–1976), subject of an iconic image of the 1976 Soweto uprising in South Africa

See also
Hector Pieterson Museum, in Orlando West, Soweto
Pietersen (disambiguation)
Peterson (disambiguation)
Petersen (disambiguation)

Patronymic surnames